Extended Video Graphics Array (or EVGA) is a standard created by VESA in 1991 (VBE 1.2) denoting a non-interlaced resolution of 1024x768 at a maximum of 70 Hz refresh rate. 

EVGA is similar to (but is not the same as) the IBM XGA standard.  The 1990s were a period of evolving standards and EVGA did not achieve wide adoption.

External links 
VESA standards:
 Video Electronics Standards Association home page
 VESA Standards Page

See also 

 Graphic display resolutions
 Super VGA
 IBM 8514/A
 IBM XGA
 Expanded Graphics Adapter (IBM 3270 PC peripheral, also referred as XGA)

References

Computer display standards